S. Sharma (born 24 October 1954) is an Indian politician who belongs to the Communist Party of India (Marxist). He is a former minister for fisheries, registration and harbour engineering, and electricity and co-operation in the Government of Kerala and a member of Kerala State Committee of Communist Party of India (Marxist). He represents the Vypeen constituency in the Kerala Legislative Assembly. He has served as the chairman of Kochi Smart City and has been on the board of Cochin International Airport.

Career
Sharma was born on 24 October 1954 in Ernakulam district. He is named after an unknown communist leader from North India; he does not belong to a community that typically uses the surname Sharma. He entered politics through Students' Federation of India and Democratic Youth Federation of India. During his political career, he has served at different times as a member of Ernakulam district committee of CPI (M) (1985), Ernakulam district secretary of DYFI, State President of DYFI (1986), and Central Committee Member of DYFI. He is currently a member of the State Committee of CPI(M).

Sharma was elected to Kerala Legislative Assembly in 1987, 1991 and 1996, 2006, 2011 and 2016 and served as minister for electricity and co-operation in the Third E. K. Nayanar ministry from October 1998 to May 2001. He was the minister for fisheries and harbour engineering and registration in the V. S. Achuthanandan ministry throughout its period. In 2016, he acted as the Protem Speaker of the 14th Kerala  Assembly. He also chaired the Public Undertakings Committee from 1996 to 1998.

References

External links

Malayali politicians
Communist Party of India (Marxist) politicians from Kerala
People from Ernakulam district
1954 births
Living people
Kerala MLAs 1987–1991
Kerala MLAs 1991–1996
Kerala MLAs 2011–2016
Kerala MLAs 2016–2021